Pietro Masala (born 9 July 1944, date of death unknown) was a German weightlifter. He competed in the men's lightweight event at the 1972 Summer Olympics.

References

1944 births
Year of death missing
German male weightlifters
Olympic weightlifters of West Germany
Weightlifters at the 1972 Summer Olympics